Belozersky District is an administrative and municipal district (raion), one of the twenty-four in Kurgan Oblast, Russia. It is located in the north of the oblast. Its administrative center is the rural locality (a selo) of Belozerskoye. Population:  21,128 (2002 Census);  The population of Belozerskoye accounts for 24.5% of the district's total population.

References

Notes

Sources

Districts of Kurgan Oblast